Bissen is a commune and town in central Luxembourg, in the canton of Mersch. It is situated on the river Attert.

, the town of Bissen, which lies in the east of the commune, has a population of 3,021.  Bissen is home to a steel factory, operated by ArcelorMittal, the world's second-largest steel manufacturer.

Population

References

External links
 

Communes in Mersch (canton)
Towns in Luxembourg